The Green Flea Markets are held every Saturday morning in Davies Park, West End, Queensland (Australia).

The Market site is home to a number of giant fig trees which have recently become infected with a fungal disease (Phellinus noxius) that is spreading all over Queensland. This is particularly interesting as the treatment of the trees is threatening the existence of this unique market.

The Green Flea Markets have been run for over six years by creator Peter Hackworth, whose licence expired in early 2009. The Brisbane City Council has since awarded the markets to Sydney-based events management company Blue Sky, who are also responsible for the South Bank markets in Brisbane as well as the Manly and Opera House markets in Sydney. Concerns have been raised by market goers and local community groups that the markets could lose their distinctive West End feel.

External links
Brian Williams, "Killer fungus strikes trees", Courier Mail, 22 November 2006.
Michael Corkill, "Menace to grand old trees", Courier Mail, 1 December 2006.
"Committed to Markets at Davies Park", Helen Abrahams Media Release, 5 December 2006.
Gian Hackworth, "Fungus-infected fig trees threaten Green Flea Market", Westender, 2007.
Tony Moore, "Sydney takeover of West End markets", Brisbane Times, 8 April 2009
Natascha Mirosch, "West End Green Flea Markets to Go" Courier Mail 'Degustation' Blog, Updated 11 April 2009

Culture of Brisbane
Flea markets
Retail markets in Australia
West End, Queensland
Retail buildings in Queensland